The Sinclair X-1 was a two-wheel electric vehicle invented in Britain by Sir Clive Sinclair. The X-1 was announced in November 2010 and was expected to be available from July 2011 at the price of £595. However, it failed to reach the market.

References

Products introduced in 2011
Sinclair Research